The canton of Orcines is an administrative division of the Puy-de-Dôme department, central France. It was created at the French canton reorganisation which came into effect in March 2015. Its seat is in Orcines.

It consists of the following communes:
 
Aurières
Aydat
Ceyssat
Chanat-la-Mouteyre
Cournols
Gelles
Heume-l'Église
Laqueuille
Mazaye
Nébouzat
Olby
Olloix
Orcines
Orcival
Perpezat
Rochefort-Montagne
Saint-Bonnet-près-Orcival
Saint-Pierre-Roche
Saint-Sandoux
Saint-Saturnin
Saulzet-le-Froid
Le Vernet-Sainte-Marguerite
Vernines

References

Cantons of Puy-de-Dôme